War Games is a song by Australian singer John Paul Young, released in 1984. It was released as the second single from One Foot in Front and it was written by John Capek and Marc Jordan. The song reached number 87 in Australia.

Track listings 
7 Inch single

12 Inch single

Charts

References 

John Paul Young songs
1984 songs
1984 singles
Songs written by John Capek
Songs written by Marc Jordan